Edward Daly may refer to:

 Edward Daly (Irish revolutionary) (1891–1916), Irish nationalist and rebel officer in the Easter Rising 
 Ed Daly, US entrepreneur behind World Airways
 Edward Daly (bishop) (1933–2016), Roman Catholic Bishop of Derry, Northern Ireland
 Edward Celestin Daly (1894–1964), Roman Catholic Bishop of Des Moines, Iowa, 1948–1964
 Edward Daly (mayor) (1926–1993), councillor and mayor of Newham, London
 Edward C. Daly (1914–1941), United States Navy sailor
 Edward M. Daly, U.S. Army General

See also
 Ed Daily (1862–1891), baseball player